Leonardo Jara (born May 20, 1991) is an Argentine footballer who plays as a right-back for Argentine Primera División club Vélez Sarsfield.

Career
Before Leonardo joined Boca Juniors, he played for Estudiantes.

D.C. United 
On January 30, 2019, Leonardo was loaned to D.C. United from Boca Juniors. He officially debuted for DC on March 3, 2019, in a game against Atlanta United FC. Leonardo typically played as right-back for United. Leonardo scored his first goal for D.C. against the New England Revolution on July 12, 2019, from a volley from Paul Arriola. D.C. United did not sign Leonardo after his loan expired following the 2019 season.

References

External links
 
 

1991 births
Living people
Argentine footballers
Argentine expatriate footballers
People from Corrientes
Sportspeople from Corrientes Province
Association football fullbacks
Estudiantes de La Plata footballers
Boca Juniors footballers
Club Atlético Vélez Sarsfield footballers
D.C. United players
Argentine Primera División players
Major League Soccer players
Argentine expatriate sportspeople in the United States
Expatriate soccer players in the United States